Lorne Brock Reid (January 20, 1929 – March 29, 1975) was a Canadian football player who played for the BC Lions and Calgary Stampeders. He played junior football in Vancouver. He died of a heart attack in 1975.

References

External links

1929 births
1975 deaths
Canadian football tackles
BC Lions players
Calgary Stampeders players
Sportspeople from Saskatoon
Players of Canadian football from Saskatchewan